Ariana Fajardo Orshan is an American lawyer who served as the  United States Attorney for the Southern District of Florida from 2018 to 2021. She was previously a Judge of the Eleventh Judicial Circuit Court of Florida.

Education

Fajardo Orshan earned her Bachelor of Science from Florida International University in 1993 and her Juris Doctor from Nova Southeastern University Shepard Broad Law Center in 1996.

Legal career

Fajardo Orshan began her legal career as an Assistant State Attorney in Miami-Dade County, where she prosecuted a wide variety of crimes specializing in narcotics and organized crime. She then was a partner in a boutique law firm where she specialized in litigation.

State judicial career

Prior to becoming a U.S. Attorney, Fajardo Orshan was a Circuit Court Judge of the Eleventh Judicial Circuit of Florida and an adjunct professor at Florida International University College of Law. She was appointed to the bench in 2012 by Governor Rick Scott.

U.S. Attorney

On June 7, 2018, President Trump announced his intent to nominate Fajardo Orshan to serve as a United States Attorney for the Southern District of Florida. On June 11, 2018, her nomination was sent to the Senate. On August 23, 2018, her nomination was reported out of committee by a voice vote. On August 28, 2018, her nomination was confirmed in the United States Senate by voice vote. Upon confirmation she became the first woman to ever be the United States Attorney in Southern Florida. Fajardo Orshan was sworn into office on September 18, 2018.

On February 8, 2021, she along with 55 other Trump-era attorneys were asked to resign. She resigned on March 26, 2021.

Personal

Fajardo Orshan is married to Robert D. Orshan and has one son.

References

External links
 Biography at Department of Justice

Living people
20th-century American lawyers
21st-century American judges
21st-century American lawyers
Florida International University alumni
Florida state court judges
Nova Southeastern University alumni
United States Attorneys for the Southern District of Florida
Year of birth missing (living people)
20th-century American women lawyers
21st-century American women lawyers
21st-century American women judges